Andrew Hamilton is a British canoeist based in Nottingham, England. He competed in slalom canoeing C1 from the mid-1990s to the mid-2000s and whitewater racing, single canoe (C1) and double canoe (C2) for Great Britain between 2000 and 2010.

Competition 
His best international result in Slalom canoeing was 8th place in the Ocoee Pre-World Championships in 2000. His results were:
 White Water World Championships: 2004 Garmisch Germany, 2006 Karlovy Vary, 2008 Ivrea, Italy, 2014 Valencia
 2014 Valencia, Italy World Championships
 World Masters Cup – White Water Racing – 2nd place with Paul Anderson in C2 canoe
 World Police and Fire Games 2013, Belfast, Northern Ireland: Men’s doubles K2 1000m sprint - 1st place, Men’s singles K1 1000m sprint – 2nd place, Men’s singles K1 500m sprint – 2nd place. Men’s singles K1 200m sprint – 2nd place, Surf kayaking – 1st Place

References  

English male canoeists
Living people
Year of birth missing (living people)
Sportspeople from Nottingham